The 1997–98 Croatian First Football League was the seventh season of the Croatian top-level football league since its establishment.

Teams

Stadia and personnel

 1 On final match day of the season, played on 10 May 1998.

First stage

Rounds 1–22 results

Championship group

Rounds 23–32 results

Relegation group

Rounds 23–32 results

Relegation play-off
The match was played on 7 June 1998.

|}

Statistics 
The top scorer was NK Zagreb's Mate Baturina, with 19 goals.
The player of the year was Mario Bazina from NK Hrvatski Dragovoljac

Top goalscorers

See also
1997–98 Croatian Football Cup

External links
1997–98 in Croatian Football at Rec.Sport.Soccer Statistics Foundation

Croatian Football League seasons
Cro
Prva Hnl, 1997-98